Anders Bæksgaard is a Danish journalist and the current political editor at the newspaper Politiken.

Biography
Anders Bæksgaard enrolled at Roskilde University in 2007 from where he obtained a master's degree in 2015. From 2011 he worked for Berlingskes Nyhedsbureau. After completing his education, he assumed a position as political journalist at  Berlingske on 1 February 2014. He succeeded Jesper Thobo-Carlsen as political editor at Politiken on 16 August 2016.

References

21st-century Danish journalists
Politiken people
Roskilde University alumni
Living people
Year of birth missing (living people)